Domodedovsky (masculine), Domodedovskaya (feminine), or Domodedovskoye (neuter) may refer to:
Domodedovsky District (1969–2011), former administrative district of Moscow Oblast, Russia
Domodedovskaya, a station of the Moscow Metro, Moscow, Russia